Thomas Frederick Anderson (30 December 1888 – 22 September 1964) was a New Zealand seaman and trade unionist. He was born in Liverpool, Lancashire, England on 30 December 1888.

References

1888 births
1964 deaths
New Zealand trade unionists
British emigrants to New Zealand
New Zealand sailors
Auckland Harbour Board members